Salvador Guerrero Llanes (January 7, 1949 – February 11, 2017), better known as Chavo Guerrero or Chavo Guerrero Sr., and also known during the 21st century as "Chavo Classic", was an American professional wrestler. He was best known for his work in Universal Wrestling Federation (UWF), American Wrestling Association (AWA), and World Wrestling Entertainment (WWE) and for being the father of third-generation wrestler Chavo Guerrero Jr. He was the oldest son of Salvador "Gory" Guerrero, and part of the Guerrero wrestling family. He was the oldest WWE Cruiserweight Champion.

Professional wrestling career

Early career
In 1977, Chavo competed for NWA Western States. Guerrero later moved his family to California so he could compete in Los Angeles's NWA Hollywood Wrestling and San Francisco's Big Time Wrestling. In NWA Hollywood, he feuded with Roddy Piper for the NWA Americas Heavyweight Championship. Between 1979 and 1980, he held the title 15 times.

Various territories
He spent the early 80's splitting his time between All Japan Pro Wrestling, Mid South Wrestling, CWF, and Houston Wrestling. In 1982, Guerrero feuded with Atsushi Onita over the NWA International Junior Heavyweight Championship in All Japan Pro Wrestling. In 1983, he feuded with Gino Hernandez in Mid South Wrestling. The feud resulted in Loser Leaves Town matches, Texas Death Matches and a Mexican Chicken Match. In 1984, he teamed with his brother Hector Guerrero in Championship Wrestling from Florida. They had rivalries with The U.S. Express, from whom they captured the NWA United States Tag Team Titles from and The Breakdancers of Brickhouse Brown and Mark Ragin. In 1985, Hector and Chavo then traveled back over to Mid South Wrestling, where they feuded with The Rock 'n' Roll Express. They then engaged in a rivalry with Ted DiBiase and "Dr. Death" Steve Williams over the UWF Tag Team Championship. In 1986, they wrestled The Fabulous Ones on multiple occasions for Mid South.

AWA and EMLL
In 1988, Mando and Chavo stopped in the AWA. They went after the AWA World Tag Team Championship held by Diamond Dallas Page's team of Badd Company (Paul Diamond and Pat Tanaka). However, they were unable to capture the titles in multiple attempts. In 1990, Chavo teamed with his brothers Mando and Eddie in EMLL. He competed with his brothers in multiple trios matches.

World Wrestling Entertainment (2004, 2010)
In 2004, Guerrero began working for World Wrestling Entertainment (WWE), joining his son Chavo Jr. in a feud with his younger brother Eddie. While with WWE, he competed as 'Chavo Classic’. On the May 20, 2004 episode of Smackdown, Chavo Classic became the oldest WWE Cruiserweight Champion in history, defeating Chavo Jr. and Spike Dudley in a triple-threat match. On the April 1 episode of SmackDown!, Classic and Chavo Jr. lost to Spike Dudley and Rey Mysterio. On the April 22 episode of SmackDown!, Classic and Chavo Jr defeated John Cena in a 2-on-1 handicap match. On the May 13 episode of SmackDown!, Chavo Classic defeated Jacqueline thanks to outside help by Chavo Jr. On the June 3 episode of SmackDown!, Chavo Classic retained the Cruiserweight title against Funaki, thanks to outside help from Chavo Jr. He lost the title to Rey Mysterio less than a month later. On June 15, 2004, he was fired by WWE for no-showing multiple SmackDown! house shows. On the November 15, 2010, "Old School" episode of Raw, Guerrero returned as Chavo Classic, driving Alberto Del Rio to the arena.

Lucha Underground (2016) 
Chavo Classic first appeared on Lucha Underground talking with Rey Mysterio about the upcoming match of the latter against his son Chavo Guerrero Jr. in a Loser Leaves Lucha match. During the match, Classic, who was in the attendance, turned on Mysterio, helping his son win the match, but Dario Cueto ordered to restart the match, and Mysterio hit the 619 on Classic and defeated Chavo Guerrero, leaving Lucha Underground without the Guerreros.

Personal life
Chavo was the son of Gory Guerrero and the older brother of Mando, Hector, and Eddie Guerrero. He grew up in El Paso, Texas He had two children, wrestler Chavo Jr. and daughter Victoria, and he was the brother in-law of Vickie Guerrero.

In July 2016, Guerrero and his son were named as part of a class action lawsuit filed against WWE that alleged wrestlers incurred traumatic brain injuries during their tenure and the company concealed the risks of injury. The suit was litigated by attorney Konstantine Kyros, who has been involved in a number of other lawsuits against WWE. Over a year after his death, US District Judge Vanessa Lynne Bryant dismissed the lawsuit in September 2018.

Death
On February 11, 2017, Guerrero died of liver cancer, at the age of 68.

Other media
In 1978 he co-starred with Henry Winkler in the movie The One and Only as a wrestler called Indian Joe. He is the subject of the song "The Legend of Chavo Guerrero" by The Mountain Goats and is featured in its music video. The 2017 Netflix series, GLOW has its 7th episode dedicated to Chavo Guerrero Sr.

Championships and accomplishments 
All Japan Pro Wrestling
NWA International Junior Heavyweight Championship (1 time)
National Wrestling Alliance
NWA World Junior Heavyweight Championship (2 times)
Atlantic Coast Championship Wrestling
ACCW Heavyweight Championship (2 times)
Championship Wrestling from Florida
NWA United States Tag Team Championship (Florida version) (1 time) – with Hector Guerrero
Eastern Wrestling Federation
EWF Heavyweight Championship (2 times)
Empire Wrestling Federation
EWF Heavyweight Championship (1 time) 
Hollywood Heavyweight Wrestling
HHW Heavyweight Championship (1 time)
International Wrestling Federation
IWF Heavyweight Championship (1 time)
NWA Hollywood Wrestling
NWA Americas Heavyweight Championship (15 times)
NWA Americas Tag Team Championship (11 times) – with Raul Mata (2), John Tolos (1), Gory Guerrero (1), Butcher Vachon (1), Victor Rivera (1), The Canadian (1), Hector Guerrero (1), El Halcon (1), Black Gordman (1) and Al Madril (1)
NWA World Light Heavyweight Championship (2 times)1
New Japan Pro-Wrestling
NWA International Junior Heavyweight Championship (2 times)
Pro Wrestling Illustrated
PWI ranked him # 130 out of the 500 best singles wrestlers during the "PWI Years" in 2003.
Southwest Championship Wrestling / Texas All-Star Wrestling
SCW Southwest Junior Heavyweight Championship (1 time)
SCW World Tag Team Championship (1 time) – with Manny Fernandez
TASW Heavyweight Championship (1 time)
TASW Texas Tag Team Championship (2 times) – with Al Madril (1) and himself (1)3
Texas All-Star USA Heavyweight Championship (1 times)
 Vendetta Pro Wrestling
 Vendetty Award—2014 Co-Special Guest star of the Year (w/ Chavo Guerrero Jr. & The Godfather)
World Wrestling Association
WWA Trios Championship (1 time) – with Mando and Eddy Guerrero
World Wrestling Entertainment/WWE
WWE Cruiserweight Championship (1 time)
Wrestling Observer Newsletter
Best Wrestling Maneuver (1986) Moonsault block
1When Chavo Guerrero won this championship, it was still officially recognized and sanctioned by the National Wrestling Alliance and was primarily defended in Consejo Mundial de Lucha Libre, an NWA affiliated promotion in Mexico. After the promotion's withdrawal from the National Wrestling Alliance, they kept the title and continue to use the NWA initials. However, the NWA no longer recognizes or sanctions it.
3Defeats Al Madril to claim Madril's part of the championship, though he quickly surrenders the titles on the same day.

References

General sources

External links 
 Chavo Guerrero Sr.: A Legend (Official Website)
 
 

1949 births
2017 deaths
Los Guerreros
American professional wrestlers of Mexican descent
People from El Paso, Texas
Professional wrestlers from Texas
Professional wrestling managers and valets
Professional wrestling trainers
American male professional wrestlers
Deaths from liver cancer
Deaths from cancer in Texas
20th-century professional wrestlers
21st-century professional wrestlers
WCW/WWE Cruiserweight Champions
NWA World Light Heavyweight Champions
NWA International Junior Heavyweight Champions
NWA United States Tag Team Champions (Florida version)
NWA Americas Tag Team Champions
NWA Americas Heavyweight Champions